Tom Zoellner is an American author and journalist. He is the author of popular non-fiction books which take multidimensional views of their subject. His work has been widely reviewed and has been featured on The Daily Show.  His book Island on Fire: The Revolt That Ended Slavery in the British Empire was a finalist for the Bancroft Prize in history and in 2021 won the National Book Critics Circle Award for Nonfiction.

Personal history

Zoellner was born on September 20, 1968, and grew up on the fringes of Tucson, Arizona, where graduated from Canyon del Oro High School. He briefly attended the University of Arizona and graduated with a B.A. in history and English from Lawrence University, where he was the editor of the campus newspaper. He worked as a general assignment reporter for a succession of newspapers throughout the United States – including the Superior Express, the Wyoming Tribune-Eagle, the Savannah Morning News, The Salt Lake Tribune, the San Francisco Chronicle and The Arizona Republic—before leaving daily journalism altogether to write books. He received an M.A.L.S degree from Dartmouth College and now works as a professor of English at Chapman University. He lives in Los Angeles.

Professional life

His first book was The Heartless Stone: A Journey Through the World of Diamonds, Deceit and Desire (St. Martin's Press, 2006), an investigative chronicle of the diamond business reported from sixteen nations. Zoellner had to go deeply into debt to do the research for this book, which also told a personal story: the demise of his engagement to a woman in San Francisco and his consequent difficulties in letting go of the diamond ring which had been given back to him. The book was called “a dazzling display of intrepid reporting,” by Entertainment Weekly magazine, and “an illuminating expose of a mineral and an industry,” by The Wall Street Journal.

His follow-up book was Uranium: War Energy and the Rock that Shaped the World (Viking/Penguin, 2009), which took a similar multi-faceted approach to a mineral as his previous look at the diamond business. Zoellner has said it is impossible to understand the true historical effect of an object without seeing its international footprint, as well as the economics, politics, psychology, physics, theology and literature of that object. Uranium was praised by The New York Times and Washington Post, and by The Daily Show host Jon Stewart, who called it “crazy, fascinating.” The book won the 2010 Science Writing Award from the American Institute of Physics.

Beginning in 2014, Zoellner was instrumental in gathering support from the Museum of Moab, San Juan County, the Bureau of Land Management, and Mark Steen—son of Charles Steen—for a historic marker commemorating Utah's uranium heritage. The marker is located on the Anticline Overlook road off U.S. 191 and was dedicated on November 4, 2016. Artist Michael Ford Dunton created an arch to frame the historical marker and view of the location of the Mi Vida mine seven miles to the east of the marker.

While working as a reporter in Arizona, Zoellner had become friends with future U.S. Rep. Gabby Giffords, who was then in the state legislature, and he later worked as a speechwriter and field organizer on her Congressional campaigns. Shortly after Giffords was shot and badly wounded in a January 8, 2011, assassination attempt, Zoellner began writing an explanation of the sociological roots of the event. The manuscript was finished in slightly under 100 days and the resulting book, A Safeway in Arizona: What the Gabrielle Giffords Shooting Tells Us About the Grand Canyon State and Life in America (Viking/Penguin, 2012), was published to mixed reviews. The Boston Globe praised it as “a masterly work of reporting, historical analysis, and sly cultural criticism,” but other reviewers faulted the book for its conclusion that Giffords’ attempted killer had been influenced by a hateful climate in Tucson preceding the 2010 midterm Congressional elections.

His next book, Train: Riding the Rails that Created the Modern World, from the Trans-Siberian to the Southwest Chief (Penguin-Random House, 2014) is a return to the multidimensional narrative of international scope. The book was reported via a series of rail journeys in Britain, Spain, Russia, China, India, Peru and across the U.S. and has been praised as “an exuberant celebration” by Booklist, "wonderful" by The Washington Post, "spirited and big-hearted," by the San Francisco Chronicle and "engaging" and "keenly observed" by The New York Times'. In 2016, he has since published articles on various facets of train safety and infrastructure.Zoellner is also the co-author of An Ordinary Man (Viking/Penguin, 2006), the autobiography of Paul Rusesabagina, the real-life hotel manager whose story was featured in the film "Hotel Rwanda." The book was a New York Times bestseller in hardcover and paperback, and was translated into 14 languages.

In 2016, Zoellner became the politics editor at the Los Angeles Review of Books.

Zoellner received a Lannan Foundation Residency Fellowship in 2017. Zoellner has previously received residencies from the Mesa Refuge, The Millay Colony for the Arts, and the Corporation at Yaddo.

In May 2020, Zoellner published Island on Fire: The Revolt That Ended Slavery in the British Empire (Harvard University Press, 2020), a day-by-day account of the Baptist War lead by Samuel Sharpe in 1831-1832. In 2021, Zoellner's Island on Fire won the National Book Critics Circle Award for Nonfiction.

In October 2020, Zoellner published The National Road: Dispatches from a Changing America (Counterpoint Press, 2020), a collection of essays based on Zoellner's years of travel and reporting throughout the United States.  NPR noted, "Zoellner has logged tens of thousands of miles zigzagging the continent with a small tent, backpack, and hiking boots. His book is a fascinating investigation into American places and themes; metaphors for our country."

The University of Arizona Press announced Zoellner's forthcoming book, Rim to River Looking into the Heart of Arizona (University of Arizona Press, 2023). The book follows Zoellner's walk across the entire state, interspersed with essays about the distinctive cultural landscape of Arizona.

In August of 2022, the National Endowment for the Humanities (NEH) announced it had awarded an NEH grant to Zoellner for "Research and writing of a book on the camps formed by fugitive slaves near Union army positions during the U.S. Civil War, and their role in bringing about the Emancipation Proclamation issued by President Abraham Lincoln in 1862."

Books

 
 
 
 
 Island on Fire: The Revolt That Ended Slavery in the British Empire.  Harvard University Press. 12 May 2020. .The National Road. Counterpoint Press US. 12 October 2020. .Rim to River: Looking into the Heart of Arizona''. University of Arizona Press. 7 March 2023. .

References

External links
 Tom Zoellner
 "The Daily Show" interview with Jon Stewart

1968 births
American male journalists
Living people
Lawrence University alumni
Dartmouth College alumni
Chapman University faculty
Journalists from Arizona
American male non-fiction writers
20th-century American journalists
20th-century American male writers
21st-century American journalists
21st-century American male writers
21st-century American non-fiction writers